Jean-François Delmas (born 21 July 1964) is a French librarian. He is chief curator of the Bibliothèque Inguimbertine and the musées de Carpentras.

Career
He is a graduate in art history and archaeology at the University of Paris-Sorbonne (Paris IV),and also holds a specialized master's degree of ESCP Europe.

Works 
  .

References

External links 
  Who's Who in France

1964 births
Living people
École Nationale des Chartes alumni
French librarians
Knights of the Ordre national du Mérite